Charles Lindbergh (1902–1974) was an American aviator.

Charles Lindbergh may also refer to:

 Charles August Lindbergh (1859–1924), U.S. Representative from Minnesota and father of the aviator
 Charles Augustus Lindbergh, Junior (1930-1932), son of the aviator and subject of the famous Lindbergh kidnapping

See also
 Charles W. Lindberg (1920–2007), veteran of, and flag raiser at, the Battle of Iwo Jima
 San Diego International Airport, also known locally as Lindbergh Field